The 1995–96 San Jose State Spartans men's basketball team represented San Jose State University during the 1995–96 NCAA Division I men's basketball season. The Spartans were led by seventh-year head coach Stan Morrison and played their home games at the Event Center Arena. SJSU was a member of the Big West Conference.

The Spartans finished the season 13–17 overall, and 9–9 in the conference. During the season, San José State was invited and participated in the Illini Classic in Champaign, Illinois. San José State lost to Ball State and Southeast Missouri State to earn 4th place. In the postseason, San José State defeated Pacific, UC Irvine, and Utah State in the 1996 Big West Conference Men's Basketball Tournament to earn 1st place in Reno, Nevada. The Spartans were invited and participated in the 1996 NCAA Division I men's basketball tournament, where they lost to Kentucky in Dallas, Texas in the first round.

Roster

Schedule

|-
!colspan=12 style=| Non-conference regular season

|-
!colspan=12 style=| Big West regular season

|-
!colspan=12 style=| Big West tournament

|-
!colspan=12 style=| NCAA tournament

References

San Jose State Spartans men's basketball seasons
San Jose State
San Jose State